San Juan, officially the Municipality of San Juan, is a 5th-class municipality in the province of Siquijor, Philippines. According to the 2020 census, it has a population of 16,363 people.

Geography

Barangays
San Juan comprises 15 barangays:

Climate

Demographics

Economy

Bugwas Festival
The Bugwas Festival is held in San Juan as the celebration of its annual town fiesta in honor of its patron saint, St. Augustine of Hippo. It was first held in 2006.

References

External links
 San Juan Profile at PhilAtlas.com
 [ Philippine Standard Geographic Code]

Municipalities of Siquijor